Betapsestis is a genus of moths belonging to the subfamily Thyatirinae of the Drepanidae.

Species
Betapsestis brevis (Leech, 1900)
Betapsestis umbrosa (Wileman, 1911)

References

 , 1921, Thousand Insects of Japan (Additamentum) 4: 850, 851.
 , 2007, Esperiana Buchreihe zur Entomologie Band 13: 1-683 

Thyatirinae
Drepanidae genera